Gúttamási is a village and former municipality in Fejér County, Hungary. The municipality of Gúttamási was divided in 1966: the village itself has been merged to Isztimér while Kincsesbánya was created from other parts.

External links 
 Isztimér.hu

Populated places in Fejér County